European route E 82 is a road part of the International E-road network. It begins in Matosinhos, Portugal and ends in Tordesillas, Spain.

The road follows: Matosinhos - Vila Real - Bragança - Zamora - Tordesillas.

History 
In the older E-roads system, used before 1985, the E82 was entirely in Poland (then Polish People's Republic) and ran from Warsaw to Piotrków Trybunalski. During that time, E-roads in Poland did not had a national numbering, therefore it was signed as E82.

References

External links 
 UN Economic Commission for Europe: Overall Map of E-road Network (2007)

82
E082
E082